The following highways are numbered 560:

Canada
  Alberta Highway 560 (Glenmore Trail)
  Ontario Highway 560
  Ontario Highway 560A

Ireland
  R560 road (Ireland)

South Africa
 R560 (South Africa)

United Kingdom
  A560 road

United States
  U.S. Route 560 (former proposal)
  Florida State Road 560 (pre-1945) (former)
  Hawaii Route 560
  Kentucky Route 560
  Louisiana Highway 560
  Louisiana Highway 560-1 (former)
  Louisiana Highway 560-2
  Louisiana Highway 560-3 (former)
  Louisiana Highway 560-4
  Maryland Route 560
  County Route 560 (New Jersey)
  County Route 560 (Erie County, New York)
  Ohio State Route 560
  Puerto Rico Highway 560
  South Carolina Highway 560
  Texas State Highway Loop 560 (former)
  Farm to Market Road 560